Mount Seitz is one in the series of peaks (2,130 m) that rise between Mirabito Range and Homerun Range in northern Victoria Land. This peak is 4 nautical miles (7 km) southeast of Mount Armagost and 9 nautical miles (17 km) northwest of Boss Peak. Mapped by United States Geological Survey (USGS) from surveys and U.S. Navy air photos, 1960–63. Named by Advisory Committee on Antarctic Names (US-ACAN) for Thomas E. Seitz, Chief Construction Mechanic, U.S. Navy, of the McMurdo Station party, 1967.

Mountains of Victoria Land
Pennell Coast